This is a list of current and former members of the city councillors in Davao City, Philippines.

A

B

C

D

I

L

M

R

V

Z

Local government in Davao City